Shri Dutt Sharma  is an Indian politician and was a member of the Sixth Legislative Assembly of Delhi. He is a member of the Aam Aadmi Party and represented Ghonda (Assembly constituency) of Delhi from 2015 to 2020. Also, he is the founder of Pt. Yad Ram Secondary Public School Bhajanpura Delhi (Estd. in 1992).

Early life and education
Shri Dutt Sharma belongs to social and pious family residing in Vill. Gamri, Bhajanpura, Delhi before 17th century.

Shri Dutt Sharma was born on 1 July 1960 in Delhi. He passed his Intermediate examination from CBSE (Raghuber Dayal Jan Kalyan School Bhajanpura).

To know his family background, past life and life journey you may visit video interview given to HamareNetaji.com : https://www.youtube.com/watch?v=9csJdFiUOOo

Political career
He joined Aam Aadmi Party on 10 December 2013. 
He contested Delhi Assembly Election 2015 and defeated Sh. Sahib Singh Chauhan (BJP) & Sh. Bhisham Sharma (Congress).

He lost to Ajay Mahawar (BJP) by a margin of 28370 votes in 2020 elections.

Posts Held

Chairman of District Development Committee (North East Delhi) 2015-2020

See also

Sixth Legislative Assembly of Delhi
Delhi Legislative Assembly
Government of India
Politics of India
Aam Aadmi Party

References 

Delhi MLAs 2015–2020
Aam Aadmi Party politicians from Delhi
People from New Delhi
1960 births
Living people